Samuel Wesley Clark (December 28, 1872 – January 7, 1949) was an American attorney, Attorney General of South Dakota, and U.S. Attorney for the District of South Dakota.

Early life and education
Clark was born Samuel Wesley Clark to Samuel Pliny and Elizabeth Dennison Clark on December 28, 1872, in Platteville, Wisconsin. In his formative youth, he read law books while tending to his family's cattle herd on the prairie. He attended Redfield College then read law under Thomas Sterling.

Career
Clark was the state's attorney of Spink County, South Dakota, from 1900 to 1904. He served as Attorney General of South Dakota from 1907 to 1911 before being appointed United States Attorney for the District of South Dakota at the recommendation of Thomas Sterling and serving from 1921 to 1926.

Personal life 
In 1900, he married Daisy Labrie, who died in 1915. Later he married Essie Eggler in 1919. He was a Congregationalist.

References

1872 births
1949 deaths
People from Platteville, Wisconsin
South Dakota Attorneys General
District attorneys in South Dakota
United States Attorneys for the District of South Dakota
South Dakota Republicans
American Congregationalists